The Dolina is a left tributary of the river Sitna in Romania. It flows into the Sitna in Leorda.

References

Rivers of Romania
Rivers of Botoșani County